The Ginetta-Zytek 09S, also known simply as the Zytek 09S, was a sports prototype race car, developed by Zytek Engineering as a Le Mans Prototype, following their partial merger with Ginetta, in 2009. It was built and designed complying with LMP1 rules and regulations, and is a direct evolution of the Ginetta-Zytek GZ09S.

References

Le Mans Prototypes
Ginetta vehicles
24 Hours of Le Mans race cars
Sports prototypes
Zytek Engineering vehicles